Hotel Lester-Lester Cafe, also known as the Dodge House-Long Branch, is a historic building located in Mason City, Iowa, United States.  Its construction, completed in 1915, was a project undertaken by local real estate developer Meir Wolf.  It was built as a two-story building a block away from the passenger and freight depots of the Chicago and North Western Railroad and the Chicago Great Western Railway.  The building was meant to be used as a railroad hotel so passengers and rail employees would not have to travel the six to eight blocks to the hotels downtown.  It is the only remaining railroad hotel left in Mason City.  Hotel guests stayed in the 29 rooms on the second floor, and three commercial spaces on the first floor were occupied by a variety of restaurants, grocery stores and barbershops.  Its most famous guest was track star Jesse Owens, who was in town in December 1937 for a basketball exhibition.  He could not stay at the other hotel's in town because of his race.  In 1975 the hotel's name was changed to the Dodge House and the Long Branch Saloon occupied the space that had previously housed a cafe.  By that time it was largely used as a rooming house, and it was used to house the homeless.  The building was listed on the National Register of Historic Places in 2002.

An arsonist set fire to the building on September 6, 2006, and did significant damage to the structure.  It had been vacant for five years at that time.  In 2007 it was decided to remove the second floor and to convert the first floor into four apartments.

References

Hotel buildings completed in 1915
Buildings and structures in Mason City, Iowa
National Register of Historic Places in Mason City, Iowa
Hotel buildings on the National Register of Historic Places in Iowa
Commercial architecture in Iowa